Urtijëi is a town of 4,637 inhabitants in South Tyrol in northern Italy. It occupies the Val Gardena within the Dolomites, a mountain chain that is part of the Alps.

Geography
Urtijëi borders the following municipalities: Kastelruth, Villnöß, Lajen and Santa Cristina Gherdëina.

History 
The Ladin-language name Urtijëi derives from the Latin word  and the suffix , with the meaning "place of nettles". 

From 1860 to 1914 Urtijëi experienced a relevant economic growth due to the opening of a major road connecting Val Gardena to the main railroad; as a result the local woodcarving industry flourished. International tourism developed through the discovery of the Dolomites first by English tourists, and subsequently visitors from other parts of Austria-Hungary as well as the German Empire. Currently, the town's economy is mostly based on winter skiing tourism, summer hiking tourism, and woodcarving.

Coat of arms
The emblem shows Saint Ulrich, with the bishop's vestments and a gold cross in his right hand, mounted on a horse, with gold harness and a blue saddle pad, on three green mountains on a gold field. The emblem is decorated with a blue chief, with three small silver shields alternating with two golden bees; the bees symbolize the laboriousness of the inhabitants. The coat of arms was granted in 1907 and reappointed in 1970.

Blazon: Or, St Ulrich in bishops vestments with a cross Or in right hand, mounted on a white horse Proper with harness of the field and a saddle blanket Azure on a trimount Vert; On a chief Azure, two bees Or between three escutcheons Argent.

Main sights
Parish Church of Urtijëi, made in neoclassical style with baroque elements in the last part of the 18th century.
 Church of St. Jacob, of ancient foundation, it was remodeled in style Late-Gothic style during the 17th century. It preserves frescoes from the second half of the 15th century and copies of the original baroque furnishings.
 Church of St. Antonius, built in the second half of the 17th century, it combines the simple Renaissance style structure with a predominantly baroque decorative structure.
 Church of St. Anna, located in the perimeter of the municipal cemetery, it is in Late-Gothic style. Inside it preserves baroque furnishings.
Museum Gherdëina, the local heritage museum, which preserves geological, paleontological and archaeological finds found in the area, as well as a collection of wooden sculptures and toys.
 The Luis Trenker House of Culture, housed in a building designed by the architect Hubert Prachensky (1916-2009), preserves the ancient bell of the Magister Manfredinus.
 The bronze statue of the Roman legionary, sculpted in wood in 1904 by Johann Baptist Moroder and fused in bronze in 2001, in front at Villa Venezia.
 Villa Venezia, home and workshop of the sculptor Johann Baptist Moroder, constructed between 1902 and 1903 following the venetian style of architecture.

Society
According to the 2011 census, 84.19% of the population speaks  Ladin, 9.30% German, and 6.51% Italian as first language.

Notable people 

 Luis Trenker (1892–1990), film producer, director, writer, actor, architect, alpinist and bobsledder 
 Ernesto Prinoth (1923–1981), racing driver and founder of Prinoth AG
 Isolde Kostner (born 1975), former Alpine skier, medallist at the 1994 and 2002 Winter Olympics
 Carolina Kostner  (born 1987), figure skater, lives in Urtijëi
Moroder family
 Josef Moroder-Lusenberg (1846–1939), painter and sculptor
 Franz Moroder (1847–1920), politician and poet, the first mayor of Ortisei
 Johann Baptist Moroder (1870-1932), sculptor
 Rudolf Moroder-Lenèrt (1877–1914), sculptor specializing in religious art
 Ludwig Moroder (1879–1953), sculptor and teacher
 Friedrich (Rico) Moroder (1880-1937), sculptor
 Adele Moroder (1887–1966), author, wrote in the Ladin language
 Otto Moroder (1894-1977), sculptor
 David Moroder (1931-1997), luger and sculptor
 Giorgio Moroder (born 1940), singer, songwriter, DJ and record producer 
 Egon Rusina Moroder (born 1949), painter and illustrator, lives in Ortisei

References

External links

 Official website  (Ladin)  
 Museum Gherdëina - Local heritage museum 

Municipalities of South Tyrol